Cost model may refer to
 Cost model (computer science): A model used in the analysis of algorithms to define what constitutes a single step in the execution of an algorithm.
 Whole-life cost, the total cost of ownership over the life of an asset.  Also known as Life-cycle cost (LCC).